Raroia Airport  is an airport on the atoll of Raroia, part of the Tuamotu Archipelago in French Polynesia. The airport is adjacent to the village of Garumaoa.  It is not approved for night operations, and there are no hangars or repair facilities.

Airlines and destinations

References

Airports in French Polynesia